The following media outlets are located in Canada's National Capital Region, serving the cities of Ottawa, Ontario and Gatineau, Quebec. The two cities, which are adjacent and each receive virtually all television and radio stations operating in either city, are considered a single media market.

Most of the region's FM and TV stations, regardless of which community they are officially licensed to, transmit from Camp Fortune in the Gatineau Hills. Other TV stations transmit from a tower located in Manotick, in the rural south portion of Ottawa. Ryan Tower, the former transmitter tower at Camp Fortune, was taken down on November 4, 2012 and its services and some antenna elements were transferred to a new, nearby tower.

In addition to the market's local media services, Ottawa is also home to several national media operations, including CPAC (Canada's national legislature broadcaster), the digital political newspaper iPolitics, and the parliamentary bureau staff of all of Canada's major newsgathering organizations in television, radio and print. The city is also home to the legal headquarters of the Canadian Broadcasting Corporation although operational headquarters for English- and French-language services are located in Toronto and Montreal, respectively.

Radio

AM stations

FM stations

Weatheradio

Shortwave (SW)

Other radio stations
The following radio stations that can also be heard in the National Capital Region:
CHLK-FM 88.1 FM, a community radio station operating out of Perth, Ontario.
VEF315 88.7 FM, a community radio station operating out of Vankleek Hill, Ontario. 
CKS608 91.9 FM, an ultra-low power campus and internet radio station from La Cité collégiale in Ottawa. 
VF8013 92.3 FM, a very low-power French-language Christian radio station located in Ottawa. Air times of this radio station may vary.  
CHRC-FM 92.5 FM, a radio station operating out of Clarence-Rockland, Ontario.
Radio-Hull 106.5 FM, a special events radio station based in Hull, Quebec. 
CJRO-FM 107.7 FM, a very low-power community radio station in Carlsbad Springs, Ontario. CJRO-FM is also heard via low-power transmitters on 107.9 FM Vars/Sarsfield and 107.7 FM Embrun/Russell serving south-east rural Ottawa.
Some Montreal AM radio stations can also be heard in the area, such as CKGM 690, CKAC 730, and CJAD 800.

Defunct radio stations

AM

540 AM CJSB, a Ottawa-based radio station that launched in 1982 until it left the air in 1994. The station relaunched on FM at 106.9 MHz as CKQB-FM.
970 AM CKCH, ceased operations in 1994.
1350 AM CIRA-5, a Gatineau-based French language rebroadcaster of CIRA-FM Montreal ceased operations in early 2015.
1350 AM CHFO, a Gatineau-based French language community radio station from 2018 until it left the air in 2019.
1630 AM CHYW, a low-power tourist information radio station that operated from the Macdonald-Cartier International Airport from 2001  but its uncertain when the station left the air. In 2005, 2012 and 2017, applications were submitted to the CRTC to operate new radio stations on 1630 kHz to serve Ottawa and Gatineau. Those applications were either denied or withdrawn.

FM

96.5 CFDT-FM (east side) and 99.9 CFDT-FM-1 (west side), very low-power tourist information radio stations that served motorists along Highway 417. It is uncertain when or if these stations were ever in operation.
96.5 FM was also used in 2002 for a special event radio programming at 96.5 MHz in Gatineau with the call sign CIRC.
CIIO-FM, operated over various frequencies on 104.7 FM, 99.7 FM and 97.5, a tourist information station owned by Instant Information Services has been off the air since 2011. Instant Information Services also operated CIIF-FM 97.5, also a former french-language tourist information station in Ottawa. 
95.7 FM CKAV-FM-9, the local outlet of the Aboriginal Voices radio network; off the air since late 2014.
CKO (CKO-1) 106.9 FM was the Ottawa affiliate of the national CKO all-news network which ceased operations in 1989.

Television
Despite being one of Canada's largest metropolitan areas, many of the "local" stations serving Ottawa–Gatineau are, in fact, based in the Greater Toronto Area. Notably, the country's #2 and #3 private-sector broadcast networks, Global and Citytv, respectively, rely on repeaters of their Toronto-based stations, not originating stations, to serve Ottawa viewers. Despite this, however, Ottawa–Gatineau is unique among Canadian television markets, as the only market in all of Canada which has terrestrial access to virtually the entire range of Canadian broadcast networks and systems in both English and French — the larger Toronto, Montreal and Vancouver media markets each lack over-the-air access to some of the services in their market's minority language. The sole exception is aboriginal network APTN, which only has broadcast coverage in the North, but is carried on cable in Ottawa and indeed throughout the country.

Of the fourteen stations available over the air, only six actually originate from the area and provide local news. These six stations are currently owned by only three companies, with two stations apiece: the CBC (with stations for its English and French networks), RNC Media (which owns the local affiliates of the two private French-language networks, TVA and Noovo), and Bell Media (which owns stations associated with its CTV and CTV 2 networks).

Both of the CBC stations carry local evening newscasts in their respective languages. The two Bell Media-owned stations, while nominally maintaining separate news operations, do not currently compete against each other for local news; CTV airs local newscasts at midday and in the evening, while CTV 2 only broadcasts a morning newscast. As for the RNC Media stations, the TVA affiliate carries a local evening newscast, whereas the Noovo affiliate only airs short local news updates.

Rogers Cable and Vidéotron are the main cable providers in Ottawa and Gatineau, respectively.  For many years, Ottawa cable systems piped in stations from the nearest American city, Watertown, New York.  Ottawa is more than six times as large as the Watertown market, and the Watertown stations relied heavily on advertising in Ottawa for their revenue.  However, in the late 1980s, all Watertown stations except PBS outlet WNPE-TV (now WPBS) were dropped in favour of stations from Rochester, New York.  They have since been replaced with stations from Detroit, though WPBS is still carried in Ottawa.

Defunct television stations
 CFVO-TV channel 30—the region's first TVA affiliate; broadcast from 1974 to 1977
 CKXT-DT-3 channel 20—local repeater of CKXT-DT Toronto; broadcast from 2008 to 2011

Newspapers

Daily

Le Droit
Ottawa Citizen
Ottawa Sun

College and university
Algonquin Times
The Charlatan
Fulcrum
La Rotonde
The Otis
The Leveller

Community
Barrhaven Independent
Barrhaven Weekender
Canada Chinese News
Capital Chinese News
Centretown Buzz
Centretown News
Cumberland Communiqué
Ecolatino (Latin/Italian community)
The Epoch Times (Chinese Edition)
Glebe Report
Hogs Back News
Il Postino (Italian community)
Image
Kanata Kourier Standard (Now defunct)
Kitchissippi Times
La Nouvelle
Mainstreeter
Manor Park Chronicle
Manotick Messenger
The Manotick Review
The Mike on a Mic Show
Muslim Link
Nepean This Week
New Edinburgh News
Newswest
L'Ora di Ottawa (Italian community)
Orleans Star
The OSCAR
The Ottawa News
Ottawa Jewish Bulletin
Ottawa South Weekender
Ottawa This Week (various)
Ottawa Weekend Chinese News
Packet
Queenswood Newsliner
Riverviews
The Spectrum
Stittsville News
Stittsville Weekend Signal
Vistas
West Carleton Review
Weekly Journal

Other publications
Apartment613
Hill Times
iPolitics
Ottawa Business Journal
The Ottawan

Other media
CPAC
Parliament Hill offices of the Canadian Broadcasting Corporation
Canadian Broadcasting Corporation corporate headquarters
Head office of Canadian Geographic
rabble.ca

References

External links
 
 East Ontario, West Quebec Media List with contact data, mapped by Postcodes and Areas 

Ottawa
 
Media, Ottawa-Gatineau
Media, Ottawa-Gatineau
Ottawa-related lists